Haydn Henry Clifford Hill (4 July 1913 – 3 November 1992) was an English amateur footballer who represented Great Britain at the 1936 Summer Olympics. He played as a goalkeeper for Corinthian, Sheffield Wednesday, Yorkshire Amateur and Dulwich Hamlet. He also played cricket for Dorset.

Football
Hill played for Corinthian a number of times in 1934 and 1935. He played for Yorkshire Amateur in 1935 and 1936.

Hill played for the England national amateur football team 8 times between 1935 and 1938. He made his debut against Wales on 19 January 1935 and played for the last time on 12 March 1938 against Scotland.

Hill made 4 appearances for Sheffield Wednesday in 1935. He played twice in the 1934–35 Football League and twice in 1935–36.

Hill played for Dulwich Hamlet from 1937 to 1940. In his first season, he was in the team that beat Leyton 2–0 in the FA Amateur Cup final at Upton Park on 3 April 1937. At the end of the game he "was carried shoulder high off the field, and the tribute was well deserved."

Cricket
Hill played cricket for Dorset, making 24 appearances in the Minor Counties Cricket Championship between 1948 and 1953.

References

1913 births
1992 deaths
English footballers
Corinthian F.C. players
Yorkshire Amateur A.F.C. players
Footballers at the 1936 Summer Olympics
Olympic footballers of Great Britain
Dorset cricketers
Sheffield Wednesday F.C. players
Dulwich Hamlet F.C. players
English Football League players
Association football goalkeepers
English cricketers